Carol Cymbala is the choir director for the Brooklyn Tabernacle Choir. The Brooklyn Tabernacle Choir has won 6 Grammy Awards. She is the wife of pastor Jim Cymbala and daughter of pastor Clair Hutchins.

Awards 
Grammy Award for Best Gospel Choir or Chorus Album in 1993, 1995, 1999, 2000, 2001, and 2003
2005 Dove Award for Choral Collection of the Year

External links 
Carol Cymbala page at the Brooklyn Tabernacle Choir website

References

American choral conductors
Living people
21st-century American conductors (music)
Year of birth missing (living people)